Mlib Tmetuchl is a Palauan businessman and politician. He was elected to the Senate of Palau in 2000. He was the President of the Senate of Palau from 15 January 2009 to 16 January 2013.

References

Year of birth missing (living people)
Living people
Presidents of the Senate of Palau
Palauan businesspeople